Watari Station is the name of multiple train stations in Japan:

 Watari Station (Kumamoto) - (渡駅) in Kumamoto Prefecture
 Watari Station (Miyagi) - (亘理駅) in Miyagi Prefecture